The Skin Mechanic is a live album released by British musician Gary Numan during his stint with IRS Records. The album was recorded in 1988 and released in 1989.

Throughout September and October 1988, Numan embarked on an 18-date UK live tour to support his latest studio album, Metal Rhythm. The Skin Mechanic (which took its name from a lyric in the Metal Rhythm song "Hunger") was recorded at the Dominion Theatre, London on 28 September 1988. The album was released over a year later, in October 1989. It charted at UK#55, and was followed by a 1990 video release of the 1989 tour, also confusingly called The Skin Mechanic.

A remastered CD reissue appeared in 1999 with a shuffled track order (but no additional tracks) and a much expanded booklet that contained the lyrics and an essay by Steve Malins.

Track listing 

All tracks written by Gary Numan.

All timings are approximate and will vary slightly with different equipment.

1989 IRS Records CD release (EIRSACD 1019)
"Survival" – 2:12
"Respect" – 4:09
"Call Out The Dogs" – 4:04
"Cars" – 5:20
"Hunger" – 4:30
"Down in the Park" – 5:24
"New Anger" – 3:13
"Creatures" – 5:06
"Are 'Friends' Electric?" – 7:46
"Young Heart" – 4:58
"We Are Glass" – 5:05
"I Die: You Die" – 3:58
"I Can't Stop" – 3:16

1999 EMI CD reissue (7243 5 21406 2 6)
"Survival" – 2:12
"Respect" – 4:09
"Call Out The Dogs" – 4:04
"Cars" – 5:20
"Hunger" – 4:30
"Down in the Park" – 5:24
"New Anger" – 3:13
"Creatures" – 5:06
"Young Heart" – 4:58
"Are 'Friends' Electric?" – 7:46
"We Are Glass" – 5:05
"I Can't Stop" – 3:16
"I Die: You Die" – 3:58

There is no explanation for the shuffled track listing on the 1999 reissue.

Musicians
Gary Numan – vocals
Rrussell Bell – guitar
Andy Coughlan – bass
Chris Payne – keyboards, violin
Ade Orange – keyboards, saxophone
Cedric Sharpley – drums
John Webb – miming saxophone
Val Chalmers – vocals
Emma Chalmers – vocals

References 

1989 live albums
Gary Numan live albums
I.R.S. Records live albums